Jesus Lopez Castanon (born Jesús López Castañón, March 4, 1973 in Mexico City, Mexico) is a Mexican jockey in American thoroughbred racing who won the 2011 Preakness Stakes. The son of a horse trainer, two brothers were also jockeys in Mexico. Father of four children. He is married to former jockey Rolanda Simpson. Castanon got his first win at Agua Caliente Racetrack in 1989  and later that year in the United States, won the Torrey Pines Stakes at Del Mar Racetrack in California. Since then he has competed at racetracks across the United States as well as in Canada, winning more than 2,000 races.

2011 U.S. Triple Crown
On May 7, 2011, Jesus Castanon rode Shackleford to a fourth-place finish in the Kentucky Derby, the first leg of the U.S. Triple Crown series. Two weeks later on May 21, aboard Shackleford he won the second leg of Triple Crown, the Preakness Stakes.

Year End Charts

References

1973 births
Living people
Mexican jockeys
American jockeys
Sportspeople from Mexico City
Mexican emigrants to the United States